The 59th World Science Fiction Convention (Worldcon), also known as The Millennium Philcon, was held on 30 August–3 September 2001 at the Pennsylvania Convention Center and Philadelphia Marriott Hotel in Philadelphia, Pennsylvania, United States.

Participants 

Attendance was 4,592, out of 6,288 paid memberships. Of those, 933 were supporting memberships and 6 were kids-in-tow.

Guests of Honor 

 Greg Bear (author)
 Stephen Youll (artist)
 Gardner Dozois (editor)
 George Scithers (fan)
 Esther Friesner (toastmaster)

Greg Bear talked about how common many of the tropes of science fiction have become, and how this is an encouraging sign of the mainstream acceptance of science fiction. He also spoke of his father-in-law, the late Poul Anderson.

Gardner Dozois said the science fiction field had endured many boom and bust cycles before, and pointed out that historically, science fiction of today was freed from many of the unfortunate prejudices and restraints that it has had in the past.

Other program participants

Programming and events 

440 people participated in 530 panel discussions, dialogues, slide shows, autograph session, and readings. The panel on "The State of Science Fiction Publishing Today" took a troubling look at the publishing industry as a whole. There was much concern about mass market paperbacks, the catastrophic reduction in the number of book distributors from about 300 to three, and the high percentage of books returned unsold. On the panel "The Science Fiction Short Story Today" it was noted that even famous short story magazines are seeing declining circulation.

Art show 

The art show had a great variety of science fiction and fantasy oriented art. Free docent tours were led by professional artists. The Art Show Award for Best in Show was awarded to Bob Eggleton's "Quimeartha's Dream 1 & 2".

Masquerade 

The Masquerade was held Saturday evening. There were 31 competitors. Several very large dragons impressed the audience. The winning entry for Best In Show was "Fridays at Ten," a skit of several Twilight Zone episodes done in black, white, and grey costumes. "The H-Mercs" won Best Workmanship for their spectacular mechanical dragon. Intermission entertainment was supplied by Harmonytryx, a female a cappella group.

Naturally, there were many "hall costumes" as well worn throughout the con, including Centauri, Klingons, and a young Princess Ozma.

Awards

2001 Hugo Awards 

 Best Novel: Harry Potter and the Goblet of Fire by J. K. Rowling
 Best Novella: "The Ultimate Earth" by Jack Williamson (Analog, December 2000)
 Best Novelette: "Millennium Babies" by Kristine Kathryn Rusch (Asimov's, January 2000)
 Best Short Story: "Different Kinds of Darkness" by David Langford (F & SF, January 2000)
 Best Related Book: Greetings from Earth: The Art of Bob Eggleton by Bob Eggleton and Nigel Suckling (Paper Tiger)
 Best Dramatic Presentation: Crouching Tiger, Hidden Dragon
 Best Professional Editor: Gardner Dozois
 Best Professional Artist: Bob Eggleton
 Best Semiprozine: Locus, edited by Charles N. Brown
 Best Fanzine: File 770, edited by Mike Glyer
 Best Fan Writer: Dave Langford
 Best Fan Artist: Teddy Harvia

Other awards 

 John W. Campbell Award for Best New Writer: Kristine Smith

1951 Retro Hugo Awards 

 Best Novel: Farmer in the Sky by Robert A. Heinlein
 Best Novella: The Man Who Sold the Moon by Robert A. Heinlein (The Man Who Sold the Moon, Shasta Publishers)
 Best Novelette: "The Little Black Bag" by C. M. Kornbluth (Astounding Science Fiction, July 1950)
 Best Short Story: "To Serve Man" by Damon Knight (Galaxy, November 1950)
 Best Dramatic Presentation: Destination Moon
 Best Professional Editor: John W. Campbell, Jr.
 Best Professional Artist: Frank Kelly Freas
 Best Fanzine: Science Fiction Newsletter
 Best Fan Writer: Bob Silverberg
 Best Fan Artist: Jack Gaughan

Future site selection 

Boston, Massachusetts won the bid for the 62nd World Science Fiction Convention to be held in 2004.

Notes 

Many commentators spoke of the outsize the Philadelphia Convention Center. Despite the convention being sizable, "attendees seemed to rattle around the oversize room." 115 individual dealers sold goods at 258 tables in the dealers' room. Dealers reported good sales, but there was some confusion about tax laws and last-minute license charges which upset some dealers. Darrell Schweitzer said: "Imagine a convention held in a zeppelin hangar—designed for multiple zeppelins—and you will begin to get the idea... [There was] enough airspace to fly a small plane indoors."

A large exhibit of historical Worldcon artifacts was spread across the exhibit hall. There were photographs and clippings from NyCon I, held in New York City in 1939, as well as Hugo Awards, mugs, medallions, program books, t-shirts and the like from more recent conventions.

A nearby Christian convention, "For His Glory", was held simultaneously. Several attendees of that convention were disturbed by fans dressed up as demons and the like. They disrupted several panels and convention registration by singing hymns until Security was called to escort them away.

Philadelphia's Chinatown is immediately outside the convention center, and many a budget-conscious attendee ate delicious Chinese food and dim sum rather than expensive hotel fare that weekend.

On Saturday "The Junkyard Wars" were held in some of the spare space in the exhibit hall. Ten teams of six people tried to build mechanisms from whatever they could find to propel a raw egg over a barrier as far as they could without it breaking. The winning team received "a rosette and a trophy made from junk found in the hotel basement that morning."

See also 

 Hugo Award
 Science fiction
 Speculative fiction
 World Science Fiction Society
 Worldcon

References 

2001 conferences
2001 in Pennsylvania
2001 in the United States
Culture of Philadelphia
Science fiction conventions in the United States
Worldcon